Franz Rosenthal (August 31, 1914 – April 8, 2003) was the Louis M. Rabinowitz professor of Semitic languages at Yale from 1956 to 1967 and Sterling Professor Emeritus of Arabic, scholar of Arabic literature and Islam at Yale from 1967 to 1985.

Background

Rosenthal was born in Berlin, Germany into a Jewish family, on August 31, 1914, and was the second son of Kurt W. Rosenthal, a flour merchant, and Elsa Rosenthal (née Kirschstein).  He entered the University of Berlin in 1932, where he studied classics and oriental languages and civilizations. His teachers were Carl Becker (1876–1933), Richard Walzer (1900–75), and Hans Heinrich Schaeder (1896–1957). He received his Ph.D. in 1935 with a dissertation, supervised by Schaeder, on Palmyrenian inscriptions (Die Sprache der Palmyränischen Inschriften).

After teaching for a year in Florence, Italy, he became instructor at the Lehranstalt (formerly Hochschule) für die Wissenschaft des Judentums, a rabbinical seminary in Berlin. In 1938, he completed his history of Aramaic studies, which was awarded the Lidzbarski Medal and Prize from the Deutsche Morgenländische Gesellschaft. The prize money was withheld from him because he was Jewish, yet on Schaeder's initiative, he was given a prize medal in gold to compensate him for the loss.

Shortly after the infamous Kristallnacht, Rosenthal left Germany in December 1938 and went to Sweden, where he was invited through the offices of the Swedish historian of religions H.S. Nyberg (1889–1974). From there he went to England, where he arrived in April 1939, and eventually came to the United States in 1940, having received an invitation to join the faculty of the Hebrew Union College (HUC) in Cincinnati, Ohio. He became a US citizen in 1943 and during the war worked on translations from Arabic for the Office of Strategic Services in Washington, D.C. Following the war, he returned to academia, first at HUC and then in 1948 moved to the University of Pennsylvania. In 1956, he was appointed the Louis M. Rabinowitz Professor of Semitic Languages at Yale. He became a Sterling Professor in 1967 and emeritus in 1985.

Professor Rosenthal was a prolific and highly accomplished scholar who contributed much to the development of source-critical studies in Arabic in the US. His publications range from a monograph on Humor in Early Islam to a three-volume annotated translation of the Muqaddimah of Ibn Khaldun to a Grammar of Biblical Aramaic. For his translation of the Muqaddimah, he traveled to Istanbul and studied the manuscript there, among them Ibn Khaldun's autographed copy. His 1952 History of Muslim Historiography was the first study of this enormous subject. He wrote extensively on Islamic civilization, including The Muslim Concept of Freedom, The Classical Heritage in Islam, The Herb: Hashish versus Medieval Muslim Society, Gambling in Islam, On Suicide in Islam and Sweeter Than Hope: Complaint and Hope in Medieval Islam, Knowledge Triumphant: The Concept of Knowledge in Medieval Islam (Leiden: EJ. Brill, 1970), as well as three volumes of collected essays and two volumes of translations from the Arabic text of the history of the medieval Persian historian al-Tabari,  Tarikh al-Rusul wa al-Muluk (History of the Prophets and Kings). Rosenthal continued to publish in German and in English. His books have been translated into Arabic, Russian, and Turkish.

Selected works
Humor in Early Islam, 1956
The Muqaddimah: An Introduction to History, 3 volumes, 1958 – first complete translation in English of "Muqaddimah" by 14th-century Islamic scholar/statesman, Ibn Khaldun
The Muslim Concept of Freedom Prior to the Nineteenth Century, 1960
A Grammar of Biblical Aramaic, 1961
An Aramaic Handbook, 1967
Knowledge Triumphant: The Concept of Knowledge in Medieval Islam 1970 (reprinted 2007 with preface by Dimitri Gutas)
"Sweeter Than Hope": Complaint and Hope in Medieval Islam, 1983
General Introduction, And, From the Creation to the Flood, translation of History of Tabari, 1985
The Classical Heritage in Islam, 1994
Man versus Society in Medieval Islam. Brill, Leiden & Boston, 2015.  (print);  (eBook) – covering the monographs and articles on the tensions and conflicts between individuals and society as the focus of his study of Muslim social history

Awards and honors

He served as president of the American Oriental Society and was elected to both the American Philosophical Society (1961) and the American Academy of Arts and Sciences (1971).

References

This text is based on the necrologue in the Yale Bulletin & Calendar
Neue Deutsche Biographie, vol. 22, edited by Historische Kommission der Bayerischen Akademie der Wissenschaften (Berlin: Duncker & Humblot, 2005), 82–83.

External links
  "Sweeter Than Hope" By Franz Rosenthal
  In Memoriam: Franz Rosenthal
  Franz Rosenthal, 88, Interpreter and Scholar

1914 births
2003 deaths
German orientalists
Jewish orientalists
Semiticists
German Arabists
American historians of Islam
Yale University faculty
Jewish emigrants from Nazi Germany to the United States
Writers from Berlin
German male non-fiction writers
Yale Sterling Professors
Fellows of the Medieval Academy of America
Corresponding Fellows of the British Academy
Arabic–English translators
Members of the American Philosophical Society